The Battle of Lincoln, or the First Battle of Lincoln, occurred on 2 February 1141 in Lincoln, England between King Stephen of England and forces loyal to Empress Matilda.  Stephen was captured during the battle, imprisoned, and effectively deposed while Matilda ruled for a short time.

Account

The forces of King Stephen of England had been besieging Lincoln Castle but were themselves attacked by a relief force loyal to Empress Matilda and commanded by Robert, 1st Earl of Gloucester, Matilda's half-brother. The Angevin army consisted of the divisions of Robert's men, those of Ranulf, Earl of Chester and those disinherited by Stephen, while on the flank was a mass of Welsh troops led by Madog ap Maredudd, Lord of Powys, and Cadwaladr ap Gruffydd. Cadwaladr was the brother of Owain, King of Gwynedd, but Owain did not support any side in the Anarchy. Stephen's force included William of Ypres; Simon of Senlis; Gilbert of Hertford; William of Aumale, Alan of Richmond and Hugh Bigod but was markedly short of cavalry.

As soon as the battle was joined, the majority of the leading magnates fled the king.  Other important magnates captured with the king were Baldwin fitz Gilbert; Bernard de Balliol, Roger de Mowbray; Richard de Courcy; William Peverel of Nottingham; Gilbert de Gant; Ingelram de Say; Ilbert de Lacy and Richard fitzUrse, all men of respected baronial families; it had only been the Earls who had fled.

Even as the royal troops listened to the exhortations of Stephen's lieutenant, Baldwin fitz Gilbert, the advancing enemy was heard and soon the disinherited Angevin knights charged the cavalry of the five earls. On the left Earl William Aumale of York and William Ypres charged and smashed the poorly armed, 'but full of spirits', Welsh division but were themselves in turn routed 'in a moment' by the well-ordered military might of Earl Ranulf who stood out from the mass in 'his bright armour'. The earls, outnumbered and outfought, were soon put to flight and many of their men were killed and captured. King Stephen and his knights were rapidly surrounded by the Angevin force.

The rest of his division fought on with no hope of escape until all were killed or had surrendered. Baldwin fitz Richard and Richard fitz Urse 'having received many wounds, and, by their determined resistance, having gained immortal honour' were taken prisoner.

After fierce fighting in the city's streets, Stephen's forces were defeated.  Stephen himself was captured and taken to Bristol, where he was imprisoned. He was subsequently exchanged for Robert of Gloucester, who was later captured in the Rout of Winchester the following September.  This ended Matilda's brief ascendancy in the wars with Stephen.

Incidental information 

The Welsh contingent of the Angevin forces included Maredudd and Cadwgan, two of the five sons of Madog ap Idnerth, who (when he lived) was the ruling prince of Fferllys in the Welsh Marches. Conversely, Stephen was aided by prominent Marcher Lords, like Hugh de Mortimer. Following the Battle, his cause seeming lost, Hugh turned his attention to Fferllys, and invaded its northern parts the following year, killing Cadwgan (and Cadwgan's brother Hywel). In 1146, he invaded the south of Fferllys, and killed Maredudd. Matilda's son, Henry, forced Hugh to surrender his Welsh possessions; Fferllys was divided between Madog's surviving sons, Cadwallon (who received Maelienydd) and Einion Clud (who received Elfael).

In fiction 
This battle is featured in the historical novel The Pillars of the Earth by Ken Follett, and is described almost as it happened, including the capture of King Stephen and his subsequent exchange.

Similarly, it is recounted in When Christ and His Saints Slept by Sharon Penman.

The Battle of Lincoln is also an important plot element in Dead Man's Ransom, a novel in the Brother Cadfael series by Edith Pargeter (writing as Ellis Peters).

An older novel, The Villains of the Piece (aka Oath and the Sword), by Graham Shelby, also has a chapter in it describing the First Battle of Lincoln.

The first battle of Lincoln is also represented in the 2021 Microsoft video game Age of Empires 4 as a campaign mission.

See also 
Battle of Lincoln (1217)

References

Further reading

1141 in England
Military history of Lincolnshire
History of Lincoln, England
Conflicts in 1141
Battles of The Anarchy
Battles involving England
Stephen, King of England